As a province of South Africa, Limpopo province is governed through a parliamentary system of government.

Executive
The current Premier of Limpopo Province is Stanley Mathabatha who assumed office on 18 July 2013. This is the current Executive Council, as of 2019.

Legislative
The legislative functions of the provincial government are carried out by the Limpopo Legislature, which elects the leader of the largest party or coalition in the legislature as the premier of the province.

Limpopo
Limpopo